The 184th TLC Support Battalion "Cansiglio" is a telecommunications (TLC) support battalion of the Italian Army's signal corps. The battalion is based in Treviso in Veneto and assigned to the Army Logistic Command. The unit was formed in 1947 as a battalion and assigned to the Infantry Division "Folgore". In 1976 the battalion was named for the Cansiglio Pass and received the number 184th, which had been used by the 184th Connections Company that served with the 184th Infantry Division "Nembo" and the Combat Group "Folgore" during the Italian campaign of World War II. With the name and number the battalion also received its own flag. In 1993 the battalion was disbanded and its personnel used to form the Signals Materiel Repair, Supply and Experimentation Telematic Center. In 1999 the center was renamed 184th TLC Support Regiment, which received the flag and traditions of the battalion. In 2017 the regiment was disbanded and the battalion became an autonomous unit. Since 1999 the battalion is responsible to build the army's telecommunications network in northern Italy and Tuscany, and provide third line maintenance for the network in the aforementioned regions.

History

World War II 

In 1937 the Royal Air Force Paratroopers School in Tarquinia formed a Connections Company. In June 1942 the company was renamed 185th Connections Company and assigned to the 185th Paratroopers Division "Folgore". The next month the division was shipped to Libya as reinforcement for Axis forces fighting in the Western Desert Campaign. In November 1942 the Fologore division and its units were destroyed during the Second Battle of El Alamein.

In 1943 the 184th Connections Company was raised and assigned to the 184th Infantry Division "Nembo", which was based in Sardinia when the Armistice of Cassibile was announced on 8 September 1943. The Nembo remained loyal to King Victor Emmanuel II. In 1944 the division moved from Sardinia to Southern Italy to join the Italian Co-belligerent Army's Liberation Corps, which fought in the Italian campaign. On 24 September 1944 the Liberation Corps was disbanded and its units and personnel used to form the combat groups "Folgore" and "Legnano". On the same date the CLXXXIV Mixed Engineer Battalion was formed in Faicchio for the Combat Group "Folgore". The battalion consisted of the 10th Engineer Company drawn from the 30th Infantry Division "Sabauda", and the 184th Paratroopers Engineer Company and 184th Connections Company of the Nembo. Before the battalion was formally activated the personnel of the 129th Connections Company of the Puglia-Lucania Command was merged into the 184th Connections Company. The battalion distinguished itself in spring 1945 in combat along the Santerno river. For its conduct during the Italian campaign the battalion was awarded a Bronze Medal of Military Valour.

Cold War 

On 15 October 1945 the Combat Group "Folgore" was renamed Infantry Division "Folgore". On 1 January 1947 the division was reorganized and the CLXXXIV Mixed Engineer Battalion split to form the Connections Battalion "Folgore" in Florence and the Engineer Battalion "Folgore" in Vittorio Veneto. In 1953 the battalion moved to Villa Vicentina. The Connections Battalion "Folgore" consisted of a command, a command platoon, and three connections companies - one for division headquarter, one for infantry regiment, and one for artillery regiment. In the same year the battalion moved from Florence to Conegliano in Veneto.

In 1951 the battalion moved from Conegliano to Treviso. On 1 October 1952 the Connections Speciality became an autonomous speciality of the Engineer Arm, with its own school and gorget patches. On 16 May 1953 the speciality adopted the name Signal Speciality and consequently the Connections Battalion "Folgore" was renamed Signal Battalion "Folgore" on 1 June 1953. On 1 April 1954 the battalion was reduced to a company consisting of a command, a command platoon, two Marconists platoons, a signal center platoon, a phone signals platoon. On 1 November 1958 the company was again expanded to battalion and now consisted of a command, a command platoon, and two signal companies.

During the 1975 army reform the army disbanded the regimental level and newly independent battalions were granted for the first time their own flags. During the reform signal battalions were renamed for mountain passes. On 1 January 1976 the Signal Battalion "Folgore" was renamed 184th Signal Battalion "Cansiglio" and assigned to the Mechanized Division "Folgore". After the reform the battalion consisted of a command, a command and services platoon, two signal companies, and a repairs and recovery platoon. On 12 November 1976 the battalion was granted a flag by decree 846 of the President of the Italian Republic Giovanni Leone.

In 1986 the Mechanized Division "Folgore was disbanded and therefore on 1 August 1986 the battalion was transferred to the 5th Army Corps' Signal Command. On 1 June 1989 the battalion was reorganized and now consisted of a command, a command and services company, the 1st and 2nd radio relay companies, and the 3rd Signal Center Company. On 1 October 1991 the battalion added a second signal center company.

Recent times 
On 30 November 1993 the battalion was disbanded and with part of its personnel the Signals Materiel Repair, Supply and Experimentation Telematic Center was formed in Treviso. On 4 March 1995 the flag of the 184th Signal Battalion "Cansiglio" was transferred to the Shrine of the Flags in the Vittoriano in Rome.

On 1 January 1999 the center was reorganized as 184th TLC Support Regiment, which received the flag of the 184th Signal Battalion "Cansiglio". On 1 January 2000 the personnel belonging to the C2 Development and Interoperability Department was detached from the regiment and placed directly under the army's C4-IEW Command and renamed C4 Systems Development and Integration Department. On 1 January 2017 the 184th TLC Support Regiment was disbanded and its battalion became an autonomous unit and was renamed 184th TLC Support Battalion "Cansiglio".

Current structure 
As of 2023 the 184th TLC Support Battalion "Cansiglio" consists of:

  Battalion Command, in Treviso
 Command and Logistic Support Company
 Maintenance Company
 Supply Company

The Command and Logistic Support Company fields the following platoons: C3 Platoon, Transport and Materiel Platoon, Medical Platoon, and Commissariat Platoon.

External links
 Italian Army Website: 184° Battaglione Sostegno TLC "Cansiglio"

References

Signal Regiments of Italy